Swimming at the 1995 European Youth Summer Olympic Days was held at the University of Bath, England.

Medal summary

Events

Boys' events

Girls' events

References

1995 European Youth Summer Olympic Days
1995 in swimming
1995